The 1973–74 Yugoslav First Basketball League season was the 30th season of the Yugoslav First Basketball League, the highest professional basketball league in SFR Yugoslavia.

Classification 

The winning roster of Zadar:
  
  Jure Fabijanić
  
  Bruno Petani
  Josip Đerđa
  Krešimir Ćosić
  
  
  
  Branko Skroče
  Branko Bakija
  Žarko Bjedov

Coach:

Scoring leaders
 Radmilo Mišović (Borac Čačak) - ___ points (33.0ppg)
 Nikola Plećaš (Lokomotiva) - ___ points (30.4ppg)

Qualification in 1974-75 season European competitions 

FIBA European Champions Cup
 Zadar (champions)

FIBA Cup Winner's Cup
 Jugoplastika (Cup winners)
 Crvena Zvezda (title holder)

FIBA Korać Cup
 Bosna (4th)
 Partizan (6th)

References

Yugoslav First Basketball League seasons
Yugo
Yugo